Thomas Kevin Aquilina (born 2 February 2001) is an Australian professional footballer who plays as a right back for the Newcastle Jets.

Early life
Aquilina attended Bossley Park High School where he was enrolled into the selective Talented Football Program. 

Aquilina is of Maltese descent.

Career

Western Sydney Wanderers
Aquilina's professional football career began at the Western Sydney Wanderers, having come through their youth program, starting in the U15 squad in 2015. Aquilina made his A-League debut in the first round of the 2020-21 season, and had reportedly attracted interest from European clubs by the end of his first season. Aquilina spent a second season at the Wanderers, before departing after 42 appearances at the end of the 2021-22 season.

Central Coast Mariners
Having departed Western Sydney Wanderers, Aquilina joined the Central Coast Mariners for the 2022-23 season. Aquilina cited his reason for his move as an opportunity to build his career with the Mariners towards a move to a European club, given the Mariners had a strong recent track record of sending their talented players to play in Europe.

Aquilina made 13 appearances for the Mariners across all competitions, before departing mid-way through his first season with the club.

Newcastle Jets
Aquilina's departure from the Mariners came via a swap deal with the Newcastle Jets, which saw Aquilina join the Jets in exchange for James McGarry heading to the Central Coast. The Mariners and Jets share a fierce rivalry, the F3 Derby, making this a controversial move for both players involved.

Honours

International
Australia U20
AFF U-19 Youth Championship: 2019

Australia U17
AFF U-16 Youth Championship: 2016

References

External links

2001 births
Living people
Australian soccer players
Association football midfielders
Manly United FC players
Sutherland Sharks FC players
Western Sydney Wanderers FC players
Central Coast Mariners FC players
Newcastle Jets FC players
National Premier Leagues players
A-League Men players
Australian people of Maltese descent